Yrgyz (Yrğyz) is a selo in Aktobe Region, Kazakhstan. It is located by the Irgiz River. Yrgyz serves as the administrative center of Yrgyz District. Population:

Climate

References

Populated places in Aktobe Region
Irgizsky Uyezd